COMCO may refer to:
 Comco, de facto name of an American airline operating two Boeing 757 aircraft
 Comco Ikarus, German aircraft manufacturer
 Competition Commission of the Swiss Federal Department of Economic Affairs, Education and Research
 COMCO Cash Spiel

See also 
 Comcom (disambiguation)